Chepstow Town Football Club are a Welsh football club based in Chepstow, South East Wales and founded in 1878. The team play in the Ardal Leagues South East, tier 3 of the Welsh football pyramid.

Honours
 
Gwent County League Division One Champions 2011–12

Squad

References

Football clubs in Wales
Sport in Monmouthshire
Gwent County League clubs
Welsh Football League clubs
Ardal Leagues clubs